A transporter erector (TE) is a mobile system used to move rocket and launch vehicle systems while horizontal on the ground, and can provide the motive force to bring the vehicle vertical prior to final preparation for launch.

Examples 

The United States Air Force's Minuteman ICBM weapon system uses a transporter erector as a mobile system to emplace LGM-30 Minuteman missiles inside their protective launch facilities.

SpaceX refers to their system for moving and erecting the Falcon 9 and Falcon Heavy vehicles as a TE.

The large Soviet N1 (rocket) used a transporter-erector for its 4 launch attempts.

See also
Transporter erector launcher, for missiles
LGM-30 Minuteman

References

Equipment of the United States Air Force